Henry Charles Ponsonby Moore, 10th Earl of Drogheda  (21 April 1884 – 22 November 1957) was an Anglo-Irish civil servant, British Army officer, barrister and peer.

He was the son of Ponsonby Moore, 9th Earl of Drogheda and Anne Tower Moir. He worked as a clerk in the Foreign Office between 1907 and 1917. On 28 October 1908 he succeeded to his father's title and in 1913 was elected as an Irish representative peer, entitling him to a seat in the House of Lords. Having left the Foreign Office, on 31 July 1917 he commissioned into the Irish Guards and subsequently saw active service in the First World War. In 1919 he was made a Companion of the Order of St Michael and St George. He relinquished his commission in 1921.

After leaving the Army, Drogheda trained in law and became a member of the Inner Temple. During the Second World War, he served as Director-General of the Ministry of Economic Warfare between 1942 and 1945. On 1 January 1945 he was knighted as a Knight Commander of the Order of St Michael and St George. Between 1946 and 1957 he was Chairman of Committees and Deputy Speaker of the House of Lords, and in 1951 he was made a member of the Privy Council of the United Kingdom. On 30 January 1954 he was made Baron Moore, of Cobham in the County of Surrey in the Peerage of the United Kingdom, thus entitling him and his descendants to automatic seats in the House of Lords.

Between 1918 and 1922, Drogheda served as the last Lord Lieutenant of Kildare. Drogheda married twice, to Kathleen Pelham Burn and Olive Mary Meatyard, and was succeeded in his titles by his eldest son from his first marriage, Charles Moore.

References

External links
 

1884 births
1957 deaths
20th-century Anglo-Irish people
British Army personnel of World War I
British barristers
British civil servants
Irish Guards officers
Irish representative peers
Knights Commander of the Order of St Michael and St George
Lord-Lieutenants of Kildare
Members of the Inner Temple
Members of the Privy Council of the United Kingdom
Earls of Drogheda
Hereditary barons created by Elizabeth II